"Dance On My Own" is a song recorded by the South Korean girl group Loona. It was featured on the group's fourth extended play [&]. It is the group's second full song in English following their 2020 single "Star".

Composition
"Dance On My Own" is a chill mid-tempo power pop and pop song about dancing alone and feeling yourself.

Critical reception
NME's Ruby C gave the song a positive review saying the song is perfect for a warm summer night listen. She said the slower, emotional tune gives the group a chance to truly showcase their vocal prowess.

Charts

Release history

References

2021 songs
Loona (group) songs
English-language South Korean songs
Songs written by Melanie Fontana
Songs written by Nolan Sipe
Songs written by Gino Barletta